The 2016 FIM MotoGP World Championship was the premier class of the 68th F.I.M. Road Racing World Championship season.

Season summary 
Jorge Lorenzo was the defending world champion, having secured his third MotoGP title and fifth overall Championship title at the 2015 Valencian Community Grand Prix.

The riders' championship title was won for the third time by Marc Márquez, after his fifth victory of the season at the Japanese Grand Prix has given him an unassailable lead over his title rivals Lorenzo and Valentino Rossi – who both crashed out at Motegi – with three races remaining. Márquez's title marked a return to the top step for Honda after a difficult 2015 campaign for its factory team. Márquez ultimately won the championship by 49 points.

Reigning champion Lorenzo won three of the first six races to lead the title race, but very poor wet weather form during wet races in mid-season curtailed his title bid along with no wins in the dry until the season-ending race in Valencia. Rossi has been the most consistent title challenger, yet he has crashed out of three races up until Márquez's decisive victory in Japan. The Yamaha team has suffered a severe win drought from June onwards, going eight races without a win before Márquez has clinched the title. Rossi has clinched the runner-up position by 16 points from Lorenzo, while their performances earned Yamaha the teams' championship, although Honda won the manufacturers' championship. The only rookie in this season was Tito Rabat – who clinched the rookie of the year award. LCR Honda rider, Cal Crutchlow, achieved the top independent rider award; winning races at Brno and Phillip Island and finished in 7th place in the championship with 141 points. Ducati and Suzuki both have won at least one race during the season, with Ducati's first win marking the first non Yamaha or Honda win for six years.

The 2016 season saw numerous records in regards to race winners. Cal Crutchlow, Jack Miller, Andrea Iannone and Maverick Viñales each won their first races in the premier class, the first time that four new winners had emerged in a MotoGP season. Between the Italian Grand Prix in May and the San Marino Grand Prix in September, eight riders – Lorenzo, Rossi, Miller, Márquez, Iannone, Crutchlow, Viñales and Dani Pedrosa – won in eight successive races, surpassing the previous record of seven, between the 1999 Imola Grand Prix and the 2000 South African Grand Prix. With a win for Andrea Dovizioso in Malaysia further adding to the tally, the total of nine winners was also a record for a single premier class season, surpassing the previous record of eight in the  season. This season also marked the first non-factory teams to win a race since the 2006 season, with wins for Marc VDS from Miller (at the Dutch TT) and for LCR from Crutchlow (at the Czech and Australian Grands Prix).

Calendar
The following Grands Prix took place in 2016:

 ‡ = Night race

Calendar changes
 The Grand Prix of the Americas and the Argentine Grand Prix have swapped places, with Argentina hosting the second round, while the Grand Prix of the Americas hosts the third round.
 For the first time in the history of the Dutch TT, the races were held on a Sunday.
 The 2016 season had seen the return of the Austrian Grand Prix to the series' schedule after 19 years of  absence. The last race, which had been the 1997 Austrian Grand Prix, was held at the A1 Ring, now called the Red Bull Ring.
 Having been on the calendar since 2008, the Indianapolis Grand Prix was taken off the calendar.

Teams and riders
A provisional entry list was announced on 7 November 2015.

Notes

All the bikes used Michelin tyres.

Team changes
 Marc VDS Racing expanded to enter a second bike.
 After entering two bikes in 2015, LCR Team reverted to a single entry in 2016.
 Forward Racing left MotoGP, as they announced a new partnership with MV Agusta in the Superbike World Championship and Supersport World Championship in 2016.
 AB Motoracing left MotoGP as Karel Abraham moved to the Superbike World Championship.
 IodaRacing announced that they would have left MotoGP and competed in the Superbike World Championship. Their constructor, ART, also left MotoGP.

Rider changes
 Tito Rabat, the 2014 Moto2 World Champion, made his MotoGP debut with Marc VDS Racing, the team he had won the Moto2 title with.
 Yonny Hernández did not have his contract with Pramac Racing renewed, and moved to Aspar Team to replace Nicky Hayden, who left MotoGP for the Superbike World Championship.
 Having competed in MotoGP since 2011, Karel Abraham switched to the Superbike World Championship.
 Loris Baz moved to Avintia Racing to replace Mike Di Meglio who moved to the Endurance World Championship.
 Scott Redding left Marc VDS Racing at the end of the 2015 season to join Pramac Racing. His place was taken by Jack Miller.
 Alex de Angelis left MotoGP for the Superbike World Championship.
 Stefan Bradl remained with Aprilia after riding for them as a replacement rider in the 2015 season after Marco Melandri left MotoGP during the middle of the season.

Rule changes
 Starting in 2016, Michelin has become the series' official tyre supplier following Bridgestone's withdrawal from the category. Dorna have also agreed a rule change to the 2016 regulations to increase the wheel size from 16.5 inches to 17 inches (similar to Moto2 and Moto3).
The previous Factory and Open classes will be merged: every bike must adopt the unified electronic package (ECU and software). Each rider will be able to use up to seven engines in a season, albeit with frozen specifications, and the maximum fuel tank capacity will be 22 litres. Factories without a dry win between 2013 and 2015 will still be allowed to use 12 engines with free development, but in case of a determined number of podiums or wins scored during 2016 the factory will lose these benefits for the next season. Similarly, any manufacturer not scoring a single podium in 2016 will gain those concessions in 2017.

Results and standings

Grands Prix

Riders' standings
Scoring system
Points were awarded to the top fifteen finishers. A rider had to finish the race to earn points.

Constructors' standings
Scoring system
Points were awarded to the top fifteen finishers. A rider had to finish the race to earn points.

 Each constructor got the same number of points as their best placed rider in each race.

Teams' standings
The teams' standings were based on results obtained by regular and substitute riders; wild-card entries were ineligible.

References

External links
 The official website of Grand Prix motorcycle racing

 
MotoGP
Grand Prix motorcycle racing seasons